De Haas is a Dutch surname. Meaning "the hare", its origin may be descriptive or the name of an address. Among variant forms are De Haes, DeHaas, Dehaes, and Den Haas. People with this name include:

De Haas / DeHaas
 Darius de Haas (born 1968), American stage actor and singer
 Deborah DeHaas (born 1959), American businesswoman
 Geertruida de Haas-Lorentz (1885–1973), Dutch physicist, daughter of Hendrik Lorentz, wife of Wander Johannes de Haas
 Irma de Haas (born 1975), Dutch volleyball player
 Jack de Haas (1875–1940), Dutch draughts player 
 Jacob de Haas (1872–1937), British Hasidic Jew and a leader for modern Zionism movement
 Johannes Hubertus Leonardus de Haas (1832–1908), Dutch animal and landscape painter
 Mauritz de Haas (1832–1895), Dutch-born American painter
 Nico de Haas (1907–2000), Dutch graphic-designer
 Saskia de Haas, Dutch cellist
 Troy de Haas (born 1979), Australian athlete
 Walter de Haas (1886–1969), better known under the pseudonym Hanns Günther, German author, translator, and publisher of popular scientific works
 Wander Johannes de Haas (1878–1960), Dutch physicist
 William Frederick de Haas (1830–1880), Dutch-born American painter
De Haes / Dehaes
Carlos de Haes (1829–1898), Belgian-born Spanish painter
Frans De Haes (1895–1923), Belgian weightlifter
Gilles De Haes (1597–1657), Flemish soldier, general of the Army of Tyrol, governor of Dalmatia
Jos De Haes (1920–1974), Flemish writer and poet
Kenny Dehaes (born 1984), Belgian racing cyclist

See also 
 Haas (surname)

References

Dutch-language surnames